Sharīf al-Dīn Abu Ali Muḥammad ibn Sana' al-Mulk As'ad ibn Ali al-Jawwani (1131–1192) better known as Al-Jawwani, was a 12th-century Arab Egyptian historian and genealogist in Fatimid Egypt.

Life 
Al-Jawwani was born in Cairo to a family of Husaynid descent (descendants of Husayn) and he was known by the honorific title al-Sharif. His father, who was originally from Mosul, immigrated west where he settled in Cairo, which at the time was the capital city of the Fatimid Caliphate, and he reached a high status at the Fatimid court. Al-Jawwani followed in his father's footsteps and also served the Fatimids, in particular holding the position of Naqib al-ashraf.

Works 
 al-Nuqat li mu'jam ma Ushkil min al-Khitat (Points on Difficult Plans)
 al-Jawhar al-Maknun fi Dhikr al-Qaba'il wal Butun (The Jewel on Tribes)

References

See also 
 List of pre-modern Arab scientists and scholars
 List of Muslim historians

12th-century Arabs
12th-century people from the Fatimid Caliphate
1131 births
1192 deaths
Officials of the Fatimid Caliphate
Husaynids
12th-century Egyptian historians